Itapemirim is a municipality located in the Brazilian state of Espírito Santo.

The municipality contains part of the protected area of the Frade e a Freira Natural Monument.

References

Populated coastal places in Espírito Santo
Municipalities in Espírito Santo